Arnedillo is a village in the province and autonomous community of La Rioja, Spain. It is crossed by the Cidacos River.

Arnedillo is famous for its hot springs, which emerge on the surface after being filtered at a temperature of about 50°C (125°F). There is a hot springs resort known as "Balneario de Arnedillo", which attracts many people to this small village.

Another tourist attraction are the footprints of dinosaurs that can be found near Arnedillo.

History 
The origin of the village dates back to the Tenth Century.

Places of Interest

Buildings and monuments 

 Castle Bridge.
 Castle.
 Saint Servando and Saint German Church.

 Hermitages: Saint Tirso, Peñalba, Virgin of the Tower, Saint Andrew, Saint Michael, Santiago, Saint Zoilo.

Hot Springs 
The municipality is well known for its thermal waters, which flow through several springs. Some of them are leveraged by the village's resort known as "Balneario de Arnedillo", and others are opened to everyone and they are known as "Pozas".

Other places of Interest 

 Footprints of dinosaurs.
Snowfield.
The vulture's viewpoint.
Wind farm.

References

Populated places in La Rioja (Spain)